Thanes Creek is a rural locality in the Southern Downs Region, Queensland, Australia. In the  Thanes Creek had a population of 30 people.

Geography

History 
The locality was named after the creek, which was in turn named after John Thane, a pioneer pastoralist of the Ellangowan Run, who drowned in the Condamine River  in 1844.

Thanes Creek Presbyterian Church opened on Sunday 20 October 1901.

In the  Thanes Creek had a population of 30 people.

Gold mining and fossicking
Thanes Creek is a former gold mining area, and the site of a government approved gold fossicking area.

References 

Southern Downs Region
Localities in Queensland